Willie Anderson (born 3 April 1955 in Sixmilecross, Northern Ireland) is a rugby union coach and former Ireland international. A lock, Anderson was capped 27 times for the national side between 1984 and 1990, some of which as captain. In one notable appearance as captain against the All Blacks, Anderson led his side into a confrontation with their opponents while they were performing the haka.

While on a 1980 tour in Buenos Aires, Anderson was imprisoned for three months by the Argentinian authorities after attempting to smuggle a flag from a government building. He was later cleared of "demeaning a patriotic symbol".

In a memorable moment, Anderson along with his French rugby counterpart Jean Condom, unwittingly became the subject of an amusing banner spotted by TV cameras in the crowd during a 5 Nations rugby match at Lansdowne Road in Ireland's championship campaign of 1985. The banner proudly read 'Our Willie's bigger than your Condom!'. Willie is also the father of fashion designer Jonathan Anderson who designed the Super Bowl performance outfit worn by the singer Rhianna in February 2023.

He attended Omagh Academy.

Coaching
After retiring he became assistant coach of Leinster and later the Scottish national team, both under head coach Matt Williams. After a spell as a full-time physical education teacher and rugby coach at Grosvenor Grammar School and later at Sullivan Upper School, Anderson was appointed head coach of Rainey Old Boys in July 2007.

Anderson coaches Coolmine R.F.C.'s senior first XV. They play in Division 1 of the Leinster League. On 22 March 2011, Willie Anderson led Sullivan Upper School to their second Medallion Shield Victory defeating Limavady Grammar School 17-0.

References

External links
Profile and national team statistics at official IRFU website

1955 births
Living people
Alumni of Stranmillis University College
Dungannon RFC players
Ireland international rugby union players
Irish rugby union coaches
Irish rugby union players
Leinster Rugby non-playing staff
People educated at Omagh Academy
Rugby union players from County Tyrone
Ulster Rugby players
Ulster Scots people
Rugby union locks